Heinrich Dockweiler (Henry Dockweiler) — Bavarian emigrant, early Los Angeles pioneer and politician.
Isidore B. Dockweiler — Los Angeles lawyer and California politician
John F. Dockweiler — Los Angeles lawyer and California congressperson: 74th-75th Congresses (1933-1939)

See also
Dockweiler (disambiguation)

People from Los Angeles